Steven Peter Robert Albert van Weyenberg (born 21 March 1973) is a Belgian-born Dutch politician, who served as State Secretary for Infrastructure and Water Management in the (demissionary) third Rutte cabinet from 10 August 2021 till 10 January 2022. A member of the Democrats 66 (D66), he previously held a seat in the House of Representatives from 20 September 2012 to 2 September 2021. Prior to being elected, he worked as a civil servant for the Ministry of Economic Affairs and the Ministry of Social Affairs and Employment.

References 

1973 births
21st-century Dutch politicians
Democrats 66 politicians
Dutch civil servants
Living people
Members of the House of Representatives (Netherlands)
Politicians from Ghent
People from Hoorn
University of Amsterdam alumni
20th-century Dutch people